Bulbophyllum barbigerum (bearded bulbophyllum) is a species of orchid found in parts of West and Central Africa. The flowers are hairy and have an unpleasant odor.

Notes

External links 

barbigerum
Plants described in 1837